Jacques Antoine Beaufort (1721 in Paris – 1784 in Rueil), was an 18th-century academic French painter. Little is known of his early life but he had his first public exhibition at the Marseille Academy in 1756, where he taught drawing, and later at the Paris Salon (1767–83). He was accepted into the Academie Royale in 1766.

Works 

His best known painting is the Oath of Brutus to avenge Lucretia (Salon 1771). Other works include Roman Charity (Salon 1777). The Death of Calamus in the Presence of Alexander (Salon 1779) which was in the Musée des Beaux-Arts de Caen was destroyed in World War II (1944).

References 

1721 births
1784 deaths
18th-century French painters
French male painters
18th-century French male artists